The Monastery of Saint Stephen or Saint Stephen's Abbey may refer to:

Abbey of Saint-Étienne, Caen
Convento de San Esteban, Salamanca
Monastery of Saint Stephen (Meteora)
St. Stephen's Abbey, Augsburg
St. Stephen's Abbey, Würzburg
Saint Stephen Monastery of Goght